Microeurydemus flavescens is a species of leaf beetle of Saudi Arabia and Oman, first described by Gilbert Ernest Bryant in 1942.

References

Eumolpinae
Beetles of Asia
Insects of the Arabian Peninsula
Beetles described in 1942